Anthonia Wayne "Amp" Lee (born October 1, 1971) is an American football coach and former professional running back who played nine seasons in the National Football League.

Playing career
Lee was drafted by the San Francisco 49ers in the second round of the 1992 NFL Draft.  A 5'11", 200-lb. running back from Florida State University, Lee played in nine NFL seasons from 1992 to 2000.  His best year as a professional came during the 1995 season as a member of the Minnesota Vikings when he caught 71 receptions.  In 1997, Lee was named team MVP for the St. Louis Rams. He was a part of the Rams' Super Bowl XXXIV winning team.

Lee caught Joe Montana's final touchdown pass for the 49ers in 1992.

Coaching career
Lee was the running backs coach for the Las Vegas Locomotives of the United Football League during their existence from 2009 to 2012.

Personal life
Lee is the father of current Phoenix Suns guard Saben Lee.

References

1971 births
Living people
American football running backs
Amsterdam Admirals coaches
Berlin Thunder coaches
Florida State Seminoles football players
Las Vegas Locomotives coaches
Minnesota Vikings players
Philadelphia Eagles players
San Francisco 49ers players
St. Louis Rams players
People from Chipley, Florida
Players of American football from Florida